The Marsh is a Canadian drama film, directed by Kim Nguyen and released in 2002. Set in Eastern Europe during the 19th century, the film stars Gregory Hlady and Paul Ahmarani as Alexandre and Ulysse, two social outcasts who settle on a haunted marsh on the outskirts of a village, but become wrongly suspected of criminal wrongdoing after a woman from the village disappears.

The film's cast also includes Gabriel Gascon, Karina Aktouf, James Hyndman, Réal Bossé and Alex Ivanovici.

The film premiered at the 2002 Toronto International Film Festival.

Gascon received a Genie Award nomination for Best Supporting Actor at the 23rd Genie Awards. The film received six Prix Jutra nominations at the 5th Jutra Awards, for Best Film, Best Director (Nguyen), Best Actor (Ahmarani), Best Screenplay (Nguyen), Best Cinematography (Eric Cayla and Daniel Vincelette), and Best Art Direction (Monique Dion).

References

External links 
 

2002 films
Canadian drama films
Films directed by Kim Nguyen
French-language Canadian films
2000s Canadian films